Valka district was an administrative division of Latvia, located in Vidzeme region, in the country's north-east. The district's area was 2441 km2. The population was 31,314 inhabitants in 2008.
The district contained 4 towns and 17 parishes.  The towns are: Valka (6459), Smiltene (5996), Strenči (1474), and  Seda (1692).

Districts were eliminated during the administrative-territorial reform in 2009.

References

Districts of Latvia